Dominic Edward Barrow (born 19 March 1993) is an English rugby union lock who plays for Sale Sharks.  Barrow previously played for Yorkshire Carnegie in the RFU Championship, Newcastle Falcons and Leicester Tigers in Premiership Rugby and La Rochelle in France's Top 14. He joined Sale Sharks in February 2022, having initially retired from the game in 2020.

Club career
Barrow came through the Yorkshire Carnegie academy to make his first-team debut as a teenager in 2010–11 season in the Amlin Challenge Cup. On 10 June 2013, Barrow joined Newcastle Falcons on a two-year contract from the 2013–14 season. However, he was granted early release, to sign for Leicester Tigers from the 2015–16 season.

On 22 March 2018, Barrow left Leicester to join La Rochelle in France's Top 14 with immediate effect as a medical joker. On the same date, it was also confirmed that Barrow will join Premiership rivals Northampton Saints for the 2018–19 season. 

After two years of retirement from the game, Barrow returned to professional rugby with Sale Sharks in the Premiership Rugby on a permanent deal after impressive performance initially on trial.

International career
After captaining England at under-16 and under-18 levels, Barrow joined the under-20s squad, winning the 2013 IRB Junior World Championship held in France.

References

External links
Leicester Tigers Profile

1993 births
Living people
English rugby union players
Leeds Tykes players
Leicester Tigers players
Newcastle Falcons players
Northampton Saints players
Rugby union locks
Rugby union players from Sheffield
Sale Sharks players